Tear Me Apart is the tenth studio album by American country music artist Tanya Tucker released on October 29. 1979. Produced by British rocker Mike Chapman, who along with longtime songwriting partner Nicky Chinn, wrote two of its songs, it continues the more rock-based sound begun on the preceding TNT, but even more so. The album rose to the No. 33 position on the  Billboard Country Albums chart, although there were no charting singles for the first time in Tucker's career.

Track listing

Personnel
Tanya Tucker - lead vocals
Beau Segal - drums, percussion
Jeff Eyrich - bass guitar
Steve Goldstein - keyboards
Bill Andersen, Jerry Swallow - guitar
Jerry Swallow - mandolin
Jerry Peterson - saxophone
Bill Andersen, Rusty Buchanan, Steve Goldstein, Lynda Lawley, Sue Richman, Andrea Robinson, Julia Tillman Waters, Tanya Tucker, Luther Waters, Oren Waters, Maxine Willard Waters - backing vocals

References

1979 albums
Tanya Tucker albums
Albums produced by Mike Chapman
MCA Records albums